Pierre Camara (born 15 September 1965) is a retired French triple jumper, best known for his triple jump gold medal at the 1993 World Indoor Championships. In the triple jump final of those championships, he jumped 17.59 m, which was a new championship record and a new French indoor record. His French indoor record of 17.59 m was broken in 2010 by Teddy Tamgho. Camara was born in Castres, Tarn.

International competitions

References

Pierre Camara's profile at Sports Reference.com

1965 births
Living people
People from Castres
French male triple jumpers
Olympic athletes of France
Athletes (track and field) at the 1992 Summer Olympics
World Athletics Championships athletes for France
Sportspeople from Tarn (department)
Mediterranean Games gold medalists for France
Mediterranean Games medalists in athletics
Athletes (track and field) at the 1993 Mediterranean Games
World Athletics Indoor Championships winners